Theodore Manaen (1922-2020) was an Indian politician. He was the 1st Gorkha to be chosen as the General Secretary of the All India Congress Committee under Nehru's regime. He was twice elected to the Lok Sabha, lower house of the Parliament of India from Darjeeling, West Bengal; The 1st time as a member of the Gorkha League and the 2nd time as a member of the Indian National Congress.

References

External links
Official biographical sketch in Parliament of India website

India MPs 1957–1962
India MPs 1962–1967
Lok Sabha members from West Bengal
Indian National Congress politicians
1922 births
2020 deaths
Indian Gorkhas
People from Darjeeling district